Note: This ship should not be confused with the third  or fourth , which were in commission at the same time.

The fifth USS Resolute (SP-3003), also referred to by the designation ID-3003, was a motorboat that entered service in the United States Navy as a ship's tender in 1918.

Resolute was built as a private motorboat during 1913 at the yard of Robert Jacob at City Island, New York. The U.S. Navy acquired her on 21 January 1918 from her owner, George A. Cormack of New York City, for use during World War I, placing her in service as USS Resolute, designated either SP-3003 or ID-3003, the difference in reported designation occurring perhaps because the U.S. Navy sometimes used the "SP" and "Id. No." designations interchangeably for civilian vessels procured for World War I service.

Resolute served her entire U.S. Navy career as a ship's tender for the transport USS Mount Vernon (ID-4508), and was carried aboard Mount Vernon for use at Mount Vernons various ports of call.

Records of Resolutes career otherwise are lacking. Mount Vernon was decommissioned in September 1919, and it is likely that Resolute was disposed of, perhaps by sale, around that time.

Notes

References
 
 Department of the Navy Naval Historical Center: Online Library of Selected Images: U.S. Navy Ships: Navy motor boat Resolute (ID # 3003), 1918-ca.1919
 NavSource Online: Section Patrol Craft Photo Archive Resolute (SP 3003)

Ships built in City Island, Bronx
1913 ships
Tenders of the United States Navy
World War I auxiliary ships of the United States